Bernard de Balliol may refer to:

 Bernard I de Balliol (died 1154 x 1162), Anglo-Picard baron who supposedly founded Barnard Castle
 Bernard II de Balliol (died  1190), Anglo-Picard baron who led the capture of William the Lion, King of the Scots, in 1174